Trampthology is the first greatest hits album by former White Lion and Freak of Nature lead singer Mike Tramp, released on December 18, 2020, through Mighty Music/Target Records. The album was released to celebrate Tramp's 25th anniversary as a solo artist.

Background and recording
The compilation features sixteen of Tramp's biggest hits from his solo career plus four new songs. Tracks from every Mike Tramp solo album are included except the leftover album Songs I Left Behind and the two Mike Tramp & The Rock 'N' Roll Circuz albums: The Rock 'N' Roll Circuz and Stand Your Ground, although the song "The Road" was originally recorded on The Rock 'N' Roll Circuz album, it was later re-recorded for the album Second Time Around.

Release and promotion
The album was released on double gatefold 180-gram vinyl and double CD. One of the four new songs, "Take Me Away", was released as a single in advance and was promoted with a lyric video.

The album charted at number 17 on the Danish Hitlisten albums chart.

Track listing

Everything Is Alright
Everything Is Alright is the single disc shorter version (10 tracks) of Trampthology released in May 2021. The new compilation album features 9 of the 16 hits from Trampthology, plus one new single "Everything Is Alright". The title track was officially released as a single in February 2021, as Tramp's entry into the Eurovision Song Contest representing Denmark. The song is up against seven other entries, and the winner will be chosen at the Dansk Melodi Grand Prix on March 6. The Eurovision Song Contest finals will take place in Rotterdam, Netherlands in May which will coincide with Tramp's new compilation album. Tramp also released the official music video for "Everything Is Alright" on February 18, 2021.

Track listing

Personnel
New tracks
 Mike Tramp – vocal, electric and acoustic guitar, piano 
 Oliver Steffensen – guitar
 Marcus Nand – additional guitar
 Claus Langeskov – bass 
 Kenni Andy – drums
 Emily Garriock Langeskov – backing vocals

Additional personnel
 Guitar: Soren Anderson, Kasper Damgaard, Todd Wolfe, Henrik Berger
 Bass: Jerry Best, Jesper Haugaard, Nicholas Findsen, Emil Bendixen
 Drums: Morten Hellborn, Kasper Foss, Dorian Crozier 
 Rhythm guitar: Kenny Korade
 Keyboards: Morten Buchholz
 Hammond B-3: Dan Hemmer, Kim Bullard
 Backing vocals: James LoMenzo

Artwork
Photographer/album art - Jakob Muxoll

Charts

References

2020 compilation albums
Mike Tramp albums